Paul Lukas (born March 21, 1964) is an American journalist, author, and the founding editor of Uni Watch, a blog devoted to uniform design. Lukas has been called "sports journalism's foremost uniform reporter,” “a minutiae fetishist,” and a “professional geek."  As a journalist he helped legitimize broader news coverage of sports uniform design with his work appearing in The New York Times, GQ, Fortune, Gourmet, Saveur, The Wall Street Journal, ESPN The Magazine, Sports Illustrated, Spin, Glamour, The New Republic, The Financial Times, and InsideHook. Lukas also authored a book about the intricate design of consumer products and services.

Uni Watch
The first Uni Watch column ran on May 26, 1999, in the Village Voice and discussed baseball's evolving uniform combinations. In 2003 the column moved from the Village Voice to Slate.com. From 2004 to 2019, Uni Watch ran as a regular column on ESPN.com and was described as a "sports fashion column that helped legitimize mainstream news coverage of everything from wholesale franchise rebranding to tweaks in fonts or piping on uniform sleeves". Lukas owns the rights to the name Uni Watch, and in 2006 launched a separate blog to supplement the material in columns on ESPN.com. In 2019, Lukas had a seven-week stint as staff columnist for Sports Illustrated with 10 attributed articles about uniforms. After his departure from Sports Illustrated, he began writing articles for InsideHook — a digital sports, news, and entertainment publication. Eventually he started writing for Facebook's Bulletin, and stopped writing uniform related articles for InsideHook.

Other projects
Lukas a published a music zine from 1986 to 1988 and a created a beer zine called Beer Frame in October 1993. Lukas created a website called Inconspicuous Consumption that, "deconstructing the details of consumer culture -- details that are either so weird or obscure that we'd never see them, or so ubiquitous that we've essentially stopped seeing them". The website evolved into a book, Inconspicuous Consumption. His lifelong obsession with collecting odd items includes draft beer tap handles. Permanent Record is an object-based history project Lukas began as an investigation into the stories emerging from a bunch of old report cards found in a discarded file cabinet. The report cards are still the core of the project, but Permanent Record has "expanded to include examination of other found objects, including postcards, business records, photographs, things left inside of old books, messages in bottles, and so on."

Bibliography
Paul, Lukas (1997). Inconspicuous Consumption: An Obsessive Look at the Stuff We Take for Granted, from the Everyday to the Obscure (Three Rivers Press).

Personal life
Lukas spent his early life on Long Island, New York, United States. He resides in Brooklyn, New York. Lukas occasionally writes about his personal and social life on the Uni Watch blog, with his culinary tastes and music interests most frequently featured in daily posts.

References

External links
 Uni Watch official website

Living people
1964 births
Journalists from New York City
Writers from Brooklyn
American sports journalists